Stadniki  is a village in the administrative district of Gmina Dobczyce, within Myślenice County, Lesser Poland Voivodeship, in southern Poland.

The village has a population of 820.

References

Stadniki